The prime minister of Belgium or the premier of Belgium is the head of the federal government in the Kingdom of Belgium.

Although leaders of Government had been appointed since the independence of the country, until 1918 the king often presided over the Council of Ministers, so the modern era of the "premiership" started after World War I with Léon Delacroix. The political importance of the king of the Belgians has decreased over time, whereas the position of prime minister has gradually become more important.

Chiefs of government (1831–1918)
Political parties

Timeline from 1831 to 1919

Prime ministers (1918–present)
Political parties
Christian Democrat

Liberal

Socialist

Timeline since 1918

See also
List of Belgian monarchs
List of Belgian prime ministers by political affiliation
List of Belgian prime ministers by time in office
Lifespan timeline of prime ministers of Belgium

 
Prime minister
Belgium